George Westinghouse College Preparatory High School (formerly known as Westinghouse Area Vocational High School) is a public 4–year college preparatory selective enrollment high school located in the East Garfield Park neighborhood on the west side of Chicago, Illinois, United States. Operated by the Chicago Public Schools district, Westinghouse is named for American entrepreneur and engineer George Westinghouse. Westinghouse opened as a vocational school in 1960.

History
Opening in August 1932, Westinghouse was originally housed in a former Bunte Brothers candy factory. The building was designed by Schmidt, Garden and Martin in 1920 and was one of the largest examples of the Chicago School architectural style. The factory was converted to a high school building in 1965, opening as a neighborhood vocational high school for the 1965 school year. The first graduating class was in 1968 with 24 senior class students and 23 actually graduating. A new, $106.5 million facility was built at 3223 West Franklin Boulevard in 2009. The former building was demolished and now is the site of the school's football field.

Athletics
Westinghouse competes in the Chicago Public League (CPL) and is a member of the Illinois High School Association (IHSA). The school sport teams are nicknamed Warriors. For many years an area basketball powerhouse, The school's boys basketball team  won the Illinois Class AA Boys' Basketball Championship in 2001–02  and were Class AA fifteen times (1976–79, 1980–81, 1989–94, 1995–96, 1998–2000, 2003–06). The basketball team were Public league champions seven times (1977–78, 1980–81, 1991–92, 1993–94, 1995–96, 1999–2000, 2001–02). The girls' basketball team were Regional champions in 2013–14. In 2014-15 the boys basketball team won a conference championship and a Regional Championship in 2016–17 season for the first time since the building reopened.

Notable alumni
Mark Aguirre – 1978, basketball player who played for DePaul University and in the NBA from 1981 to 1994; first player selected in 1981 NBA Draft.
Eddie Johnson – 1977, sports broadcaster and former Illinois and NBA basketball player.
Hersey Hawkins – 1984, former professional basketball player who played for Bradley University and in the NBA for 13 seasons (1988–2001).
Kiwane Garris – 1993, former professional basketball player who played in the NBA and the Italian League.

Notes

External links

Educational institutions established in 1960
Public high schools in Chicago